The House of Pückler (with branches Von Pückler-Muskau, Von Pückler-Burghauss (Pückler-Burghauß), Von Pückler-Limpurg and Von Pückler-Groditz) was the name of an old and influential German noble family, originated from Silesia. The Imperial County of Pückler-Limpurg was mediatized by Württemberg in 1806. As immediate, that branch belonged to the high nobility, but became extinct in the male line in 1963.

Notable members 
 Count Carl Friedrich of Pückler-Burghauss, Baron of Groditz (1886, Friedland, Silesia - 1945, Čimelice)
 Erdmann Graf von Pückler-Limpurg (1792–1869)
 Erdmann von Pückler (1832–1888)
 Heinrich von Pückler (1835–1897)
 Hermann, Prince von Pückler-Muskau (1785, Muskau Castle, Bad Muskau - 1871), German nobleman, artist, famous for the Muskau Park
 Karl von Pückler-Burghauß (1817–1899)
 Walter von Pückler (1860–1924), antisemitic agitator

See also 
 39571 Pückler, main belt asteroid

German-language surnames
German noble families
Silesian nobility